Drumsticks is a 1955 Indian film directed by Shantaram Athavale. It was entered into the 1956 Cannes Film Festival.

Cast
 Baby Nanda
 Balakram
 Master Chhotu
 Sumati Gupte

Awards
 1955 - National Film Award for Best Feature Film in Marathi - Certificate of Merit

References

External links

1955 films
1950s Marathi-language films
Indian musical films
1955 musical films